Westenschouwen is a hamlet in the Dutch province of Zeeland. It is a part of the municipality of Schouwen-Duiveland, and lies about 21 km north of Middelburg.

Westenschouwen was a separate municipality until 1816, when it was merged into Burgh.

Westenschouwen was home to 88 people in 1840. The hamlet is mainly known its beach.

Gallery

References

Schouwen-Duiveland
History of Schouwen-Duiveland
Populated places in Zeeland
Former municipalities of Zeeland